is a railway station in the city of Tagajō, Miyagi Prefecture, Japan, operated by East Japan Railway Company (JR East).

Lines

Station layout
The station has one elevated side platform and one elevated island platform with the station building underneath. The station has a Midori no Madoguchi staffed ticket office.

Platforms

History
Tagajō Station opened on June 5, 1925, as a station on the Miyagi Electric Railway. The line was nationalized on May 1, 1944. The station was absorbed into the JR East network upon the privatization of JNR on April 1, 1987. A new station building was completed in November 2013.

Passenger statistics
In fiscal 2018, the station was used by an average of 7,201 passengers daily (boarding passengers only).

Surrounding area
Tagajō City Hall
Ruins of Tagajō Temple
Tagajō Post Office

See also
 List of railway stations in Japan

References

External links

  

Railway stations in Miyagi Prefecture
Senseki Line
Railway stations in Japan opened in 1925
Stations of East Japan Railway Company
Tagajō, Miyagi